Anthony of Weert was a Franciscan friar and priest who was martyred during the Dutch Revolt. Eighteen other men were martyred alongside him; they are known as the Martyrs of Gorkum.

The Martyrs of Gorkum were all beatified in 1675 and then canonised by Pope Pius IX in 1867. The martyrs share a feast day on 9 July.

History 
Anthony of Weert was a Franciscan friar and priest who belonged to the Convent of Gorcum.

Anthony was taken by Calvinists alongside 18 other individuals, 11 of those were his Franciscan brothers. On 9 July 1572, they were martyred.

See also 
 Martyrs of Gorkum
 Franciscan Friars
 Dutch Revolt

References 

Saints
16th-century Roman Catholic martyrs
16th-century Dutch Roman Catholic priests
1523 births
Beatifications by Pope Clement X
Canonizations by Pope Pius IX